Pomponio Cotta (died 11 September 1579) was a Roman Catholic prelate who served as Bishop of Novara (1577–1579).

Biography
On 19 July 1577, Pomponio Cotta was appointed during the papacy of Pope Gregory XIII as Bishop of Novara.
He served as Bishop of Novara until his death on 11 September 1579.

References

External links and additional sources
 (for Chronology of Bishops) 
 (for Chronology of Bishops) 

16th-century Italian Roman Catholic bishops
Bishops appointed by Pope Gregory XIII
1579 deaths